In Greek mythology, Aeolia (Ancient Greek: Αἰολία Aíolía) daughter of Amythaon and wife of Calydon, eponym of the city in Aetolia. She had two daughters namely Epicaste, wife of Agenor and Protogeneia, mother of Oxylus by Ares.

Notes 

Queens in Greek mythology

References 

 Apollodorus, The Library with an English Translation by Sir James George Frazer, F.B.A., F.R.S. in 2 Volumes, Cambridge, MA, Harvard University Press; London, William Heinemann Ltd. 1921. . Online version at the Perseus Digital Library. Greek text available from the same website.
Bell, Robert E., Women of Classical Mythology: A Biographical Dictionary. ABC-Clio. 1991. .

Messenian characters in Greek mythology
Aetolian characters in Greek mythology